The Wetlands Reserve Program (WRP) was a voluntary program offering landowners the opportunity to protect, restore, and enhance wetlands on their property. The USDA Natural Resources Conservation Service (NRCS) administers the program with funding from the Commodity Credit Corporation.

The Agricultural Act of 2014 established the Agricultural Conservation Easement Program (ACEP).

ACEP repealed  WRP but does not affect the validity or terms of any WRP contract, agreement or easement entered into prior to the date of enactment on February 7, 2014 or any associated payments required to be made in connection with an existing WRP contract, agreement or easement.  Codified at 16 USC 3865 et seq.

Establishment 

The WRP was established by the 1990 Farm Bill. The 1990 Farm Bill was Senate Bill S.2830 and became Public Law No: 101-624. Amendment S.AMDT.2406 (sponsored by Senator Robert Kasten) added provisions to the program.

The WRP was repealed in 2014 via the Agriculture Act of 2014, Subtitle B. https://www.congress.gov/bill/113th-congress/house-bill/2642/text?q=%7B%22search%22%3A%5B%22agricultural+act+of+2014%22%2C%22agricultural%22%2C%22act%22%2C%22of%22%2C%222014%22%5D%7D&r=1&s=10

Provisions

Producers enrolling in the program must agree to implement approved wetland restoration and protection plans. In return, participating producers receive payments based on the difference in the value of their land caused by placing an easement on a portion of it. The program reached its authorized enrollment ceiling of  before the 2002 farm bill (P.L. 107-171) was acted upon. The 2002 legislation reauthorized the program with mandatory funding from the Commodity Credit Corporation (CCC) through FY2007, and set a maximum enrollment ceiling of 2.275 million acres (and with an annual enrollment ceiling of 250,000 acres).

See also
Conservation Reserve Program
Farmable Wetlands Program

References

External links

 Wetlands Reserve Program of the Natural Resources Conservation Service, USDA

United States Department of Agriculture
Wetlands of the United States